The Soldier Integrated Protective Ensemble (SIPE) program is the initial step in developing an integrated modular clothing and equipment system for combat ground troops of the United States Army.

Testing
The field portion of the Soldier Integrated Protective Ensemble (SIPE) Advanced Technology Demonstration (ATD) was conducted at Fort Benning, Georgia, from September through November 1992. Individual task performance-data were collected by the Test and Experimentation Command (TEXCOM) Close Combat Test Directorate, and collective task performance data were assessed by personnel from the U.S. Army Infantry School (USAIS). Soldier impressions on and suggestions for the SIPE equipment were collected. As a technical advisory service to the SIPE ATD, U.S. Army Research Institute for the Behavioral and Social Sciences (ARI) personnel collected this data. The SIPE, configured as a head-to-toe individual fighting system, demonstrated considerable potential for enhanced soldier capabilities and operational effectiveness. However, the equipment, only prototype in nature, affected test soldier performance and attitude. The enhanced communications capability and thermal sight on the rifle, as well as some items of clothing, were deemed very acceptable; other items were rejected or insufficiently tested. Further testing would be beneficial.

Psychological effect
This system will increase lethality, mobility, survivability, command and control and overall protection of the troops. This environmental chamber study compared physiological responses of volunteers exercising in MOPP 0, MOPP 1, and MOPP 4 with equivalent SIPE configurations, including SIPE 4 with and without ambient air microclimate cooling (MCC). Responses to all uniforms were compared over 100 minutes of continuous treadmill walking at 30.0 deg C, 50% rh. Responses to MOPP 4 and SIPE 4 with no cooling were also compared over 100 minutes at 18.5 deg C, 50% rh. Responses to MOPP 4 and SIPE 4 MCC were compared over four hours of intermittent work-rest cycles at 30.0 deg C, .50% rh. There were no differences between MOPP 0 and SIPE 0, MOPP 1 and SIPE 1, and MOPP 4 and SIPE 4 with no cooling (in both environments) . Core temperature, skin temperature, heat storage, and heart rate were lower in SIPE 4 MCC than in MOPP 4; while evaporative cooling was greater in SIPE 4 MCC than in MOPP 4. Three volunteers completed the 4-hour tests in SIPE 4 MCC with similar advantageous trends apparent from the cooling. It is concluded that the SIPE clothing did not increase thermal strain compared to equivalent MOPP levels, and MCC, (although increasing uniform weight by approximately 10 kg) reduced thermal strain at 30.0 deg Celsius.

References

Military technology
United States Army equipment